is a Japanese voice actor and narrator affiliated with the talent management firm Crazy Box.

He is best known for his roles as the voices of Kyao Mirao in Heavy Metal L-Gaim; Mont Blanc Noland in One Piece; Yazan Gable in Mobile Suit Zeta Gundam; Akira Sendō in Slam Dunk; SignalMan in Gekisou Sentai Carranger; Imagin, Deneb in Kamen Rider Den-O, Abuto in Gintama, Makoto Sōda in Captain Tsubasa; Jiraiya in Naruto and Sakonji Urokodaki in Demon Slayer: Kimetsu no Yaiba. He is also known for dubbing for Jean-Claude Van Damme, Donnie Yen (especially in Ip Man series), Jeff Goldblum, Ray Liotta, Tim Robbins, John C. McGinley, Brent Spiner, Robert Patrick and many more. He was also the first dubbing voice actor of Kiefer Sutherland and Christopher Lambert in their early days.

Filmography

Television animation
1983
Captain Tsubasa – Makoto Sōda
Urusei Yatsura – Kuroko, Man in Glasses
1984
Heavy Metal L-Gaim – Mirauu Kyao
1985
Mobile Suit Zeta Gundam – Yazan Gable
Dirty Pair – DJ's Voice (EP 5)
High School! Kimengumi – Nihiruda Yo, Kanzenji Ai
1986
Mobile Suit Gundam ZZ – Yazan Gable
Fist of the North Star – Aus, David
1987
Metal Armor Dragonar – Tapp Oseano
Transformers: The Headmasters – Ultra Magnus, Crosshairs, Wingspan, Ratbat, Deer Stalker
1988
Transformers: Super-God Masterforce – Ranger
Anpanman – Katsubushiman
1989
Transformers: Victory – Gaihawk
Ranma ½ – Gindo
1992
Aah! Harimanada – Katsumi Shidenkai
1993
Slam Dunk – Akira Sendoh, Norio Hotta
Yaiba – Kotarou
1994
Mobile Fighter G Gundam – Chibodee Crocket
1995
Neon Genesis Evangelion – Shiro Tokita (EP 7)
1996
Detective Conan – Kikuji Bancho, Shochiro Hitomi, Takehiko Hitomi, Katsuo Nabeshima
1998
Cowboy Bebop – Session 17, Younger Shaft Brother
Pocket Monsters – Kyō (Koga)
Kurogane Communication – Cleric
1999
Zoids: Chaotic Century – Gunther Prozen
The Big O – Jason Beck
Turn A Gundam – Gavane Gooney
2000
Saiyuki – Doctor Ni Jianyi
Vandread – Tenmei Uragasami; AKA, Buzam A. Calessa "BC"
Brigadoon: Marin & Melan – Melan Blue
Kazemakase Tsukikage Ran – Takagaki Koujiro (EP 11) 
2001
Noir – Krode Freddi
Figure 17 – Isamu Kuroda
Earth Maiden Arjuna – Bob
Kaze No Yojimbo – Samekichi Shirogane
2002
RahXephon – Masayoshi Kuki
2003
Naruto – Jiraiya
Sonic X – Red Pine
Yukikaze – Karl Gunow
Tantei Gakuen Q – Taiki Yoshinari
Saiyuki Reload – Doctor Ni Jianyi
Texhnolyze – Kohagura Fuminori
Kino's Journey – Riku
2004
One Piece – Montblanc Norland
Bleach – Metastacia, Glass-wearing ghost (EP 1)
Samurai Champloo – Jouji
2005
Akagi – Kurata Group's dealer (EP 14)
Blood+ – George Miyagusuku
Full Metal Panic!: The Second Raid – Gates
Solty Rei – Hou Chuu
Gallery Fake – Roger Warner
2006
009-1 – Number Zero
Ergo Proxy – Proxy One
Coyote Ragtime Show – Bruce Dochley
Sgt. Frog – Nevara
2007
Naruto Shippuden – Jiraiya
Fist of the Blue Sky – Zhang Tai-Yan
Claymore – Orsay
Nodame Cantabile – Miyoshi Takehiro
Monster Princess – Dracul
Blue Dragon – Killer Bat
2008
Spice and Wolf – Marlheit
Soul Eater – Little Ogre
Kamen no Maid Guy – Gold Fish Miyatsuguchi (EP 11)
Kannagi – Head Maid Cafe Owner (EP 6)
Birdy the Mighty: Decode – Kinzel Hower
Golgo 13 – AX-3 (EP 14)
2009
Gintama – Abuto
Saki – Kazue Nanpo's Grandfather
The Sacred Blacksmith – August Arthur
Shangri-La – Mi-Ko
Souten Kouro – Dong Zhuo 
2010
Durarara!! – Narrator (EP 12.5: Narrator of TV program - DVD-only), Also plays the voice of Haruya Shiki (EP 15)
Arakawa Under the Bridge – Toru "Shiro" Shiroi
Working!! – Mahiru's father
Panty & Stocking with Garterbelt – Ghost (EP 4 – High School Nudical)
2011
Kaitou Kid – Snake
The Idolmaster – Junjirō Takagi
2012
Love, Chunibyo & Other Delusions – Narrator
Star Blazers: Space Battleship Yamato 2199 – Shirō Sanada
2013
Doki Doki! Precure – King Jikochu
Maoyu – Crusader Commander
Sasami-san@Ganbaranai – Kamiomi Tsukuyomi
2014
Kamigami no Asobi – Zeus Keraunos (adult)
2015
Chaos Dragon – Red Dragon
K: Return of Kings – Tenkei Iwafune
Durarara!!x2 - Haruya Shiki
2016
Ajin: Demi-Human – Satō
91 Days – Galassia
D.Gray-man Hallow – Bookman
2017
The Saga of Tanya the Evil – Hans von Zettour
Berserk (Season 2) – Laban
Alice & Zoroku – Ryū Naitō
Love Tyrant – God
March Comes in Like a Lion Season 2 – Sakutarō Yanagihara
Restaurant to Another World – Tatsugorou
2018
Pop Team Epic - Pipimi (EP 1-A)
Golden Kamuy – Lieutenant Tsurumi
Angels of Death – Abraham Gray
A Certain Magical Index III – Terra of the Left
That Time I Got Reincarnated as a Slime – Hakuro
Baki the Grappler – Biscuit Oliva
Zombie Land Saga – Master
2019
Revisions – Nicholas Satō
Demon Slayer: Kimetsu no Yaiba – Sakonji Urokodaki
Fairy Gone – Marco Bellwood
Boruto: Naruto Next Generations - Jiraiya
Cop Craft – Zerada
Isekai Quartet – Hans von Zettour
Carole & Tuesday – Hofner
Bungo Stray Dogs 3 – Natsume Sōseki
The Legend of the Galactic Heroes: Die Neue These Seiran – Murai
Levius – Malcolm Eden
2020
BNA: Brand New Animal – Prime Minister Shiramizu
Listeners – Field Marshal Ace
Tower of God – Headon
Transformers: War for Cybertron Trilogy – Megatron
The Misfit of Demon King Academy – Melheis Boran
Baki – Biscuit Oliva
Bungou to Alchemist: Shinpan no Haguruma - Taint
2021
That Time I Got Reincarnated as a Slime 2nd Season – Hakuro
Mushoku Tensei: Jobless Reincarnation – Talhand
The Slime Diaries: That Time I Got Reincarnated as a Slime – Hakuro
Edens Zero – Ziggy
Odd Taxi - Donraku Shofutei
The Duke of Death and His Maid – Rob
Life Lessons with Uramichi Oniisan – The Voice of God
Restaurant to Another World 2 – Tatsugorou
Fena: Pirate Princess – Yukihisa Sanada
Blade Runner: Black Lotus – Earl Grant
Black Summoner - Guildmaster
2022
Love of Kill – Donny
Requiem of the Rose King – Narrator
Saiyuki Reload: Zeroin – Ni Jianyi
Teasing Master Takagi-san 3 – Narrator
Ya Boy Kongming! – Tsuyoshi Kondo
The Little Lies We All Tell – Narrator
2023
A Herbivorous Dragon of 5,000 Years Gets Unfairly Villainized (Japanese dub) – Evil Dragon Ravendia
The Idolmaster Million Live! – Junjirō Takagi

TBA
Yōjo Senki: Saga of Tanya the Evil II – Hans von Zettour

Unknown date
My Sexual Harassment – Niimi
Nintama Rantarō – Yasujirō, Susumu Masayuki
Rurouni Kenshin – Tokisada Mutō
Yawara! A Fashionable Judo Girl – Announcer
Yu-Gi-Oh! Duel Monsters GX – X

OVA/ONA
Shin Captain Tsubasa (1989) – Makoto Soda and Hermann Kaltz
Dance till Tomorrow (1991) – Daisuke Ikezu
The Irresponsible Captain Tylor (1994) – Barusarōmu
3×3 Eyes (1995) – Jake McDonald
Gunsmith Cats (1995) – Bill Collins
Teenage Mutant Anime Turtles (1996) – Leonardo
Blue Submarine 6 (1998) – Alexander David Cekeros
DinoZone (1998) – Dino Stego
Last Order: Final Fantasy VII (2005) – Martial Artist Turk
Hellsing Ultimate (2007) – Tubalcain Alhambra
Space Battleship Yamato 2199 (2012) – Shiro Sanada
Cute Executive Officer (2021) – Bakery Manager
The Way of the Househusband (2021) – Boss
Tekken: Bloodline (2022) – Paul Phoenix

Unknown date
Giant Robo: The Day the Earth Stood Still – Gen
Kamen Rider Den-O: Collection DVD: Imagin Anime – Deneb
Legend of the Galactic Heroes – Kahle Willock

Theatrical animation
Nausicaä of the Valley of the Wind (1984) – Torumekia soldier
Bonobono (1993) – Sunadori Neko-san
Yu Yu Hakusho The Movie: Poltergeist Report aka Meikai Shitou Hen - Hono no Kizuna (1994) – Kuronue
Tenchi the Movie: Tenchi Muyo in Love (1996) – Sabato
Vampire Hunter D: Bloodlust (2000) – Kyle
Turn A Gundam I: Earth Light (2002) – Gavane Gooney
Mobile Suit Zeta Gundam A New Translation I: Heir to the Stars (2004) – Yazan Gable
Mobile Suit Zeta Gundam A New Translation II: Lovers (2005) – Yazan Gable
Mobile Suit Zeta Gundam A New Translation III: Love is the Pulse of the Stars (2006) – Yazan Gable
Fist of the North Star (2007) – Shuh
After School Midnighters (2012) – Fred
One Piece Film: Z (2012) – Zephyr/Z
Ajin Part 1: Shōdō (2015) – Satō
Doraemon: Nobita and the Birth of Japan 2016 (2016) – Gigazonbi
Kizumonogatari II Nekketsu-hen (2016) – Guillotinecutter
Ajin Part 2: Shōtotsu (2016) – Satō
Ajin Part 3: Shōgeki (2016) – Satō
Batman Ninja (2018) – Alfred Pennyworth
City Hunter the Movie: Shinjuku Private Eyes (2019) – Vince Ingrado
Saga of Tanya the Evil: The Movie (2019) – Hans von Zettour
Crayon Shin-chan: Honeymoon Hurricane ~The Lost Hiroshi~ (2019)
That Time I Got Reincarnated as a Slime the Movie: Scarlet Bond (2022) – Hakuro
Black Clover: Sword of the Wizard King (2023) – Edward

Tokusatsu
Gekisou Sentai Carranger (1996) – Signalman
Kamen Rider Den-O (2007) – Deneb/Kamen Rider Zeronos Vega Form
Kamen Rider Den-O: I'm Born! (2007) – Deneb/Kamen Rider Zeronos Vega Form
Kamen Rider Den-O & Kiva: Climax Deka (2008) – Deneb/Kamen Rider Zeronos Vega Form
Kaizoku Sentai Gokaiger (2011) – Signalman
Gokaiger Goseiger Super Sentai 199 Hero Great Battle (2011) – Signalman
Kamen Rider Gaim (2013) – Narrator
Super Sentai Strongest Battle (2019) – Signalman (Non Credit)
Kamen Rider Zi-O (2018-2019) – Deneb/Kamen Rider Zeronos Vega Form

Live-action
 Chimudondon (2022) – College professor

Video games

Azel: Panzer Dragoon RPG – Skiad-Ops Gash
Armored Core 2: Another Age – Emeraude
Call of Duty: Black Ops – Viktor Reznov (Japanese-dub release version)
Call of Duty: Modern Warfare 3 – Nikolai (Japanese-dub release version)
Destroy All Humans! series – Orthopox 13Future GPX Cyber Formula: A New Challenger – AKF-0/1B NemesisGungrave: Overdose – Rocketbilly RedcadillacGunparade March – Hisaomi SakagamiThe Idolm@ster 2 – Junjirou TakagiKamen Rider: Battride War – Karasu/Susumu KarashimaKamen Rider: Climax Heroes – Kamen Rider Zeronos Vega FormKingdom Hearts 358/2 Days – Xigbar Mobile Suit Gundam Side Story: The Blue Destiny – Alph KamraNew Century Brave Wars - LayzerSly 3: Honor Among Thieves – Captain LeFweeStreet Fighter Alpha 3 – Dee JaySuper Robot Wars – Yazan Gable, Chibodee Crocket, Gavane Gooney, Jason Beck, Miraū Kyao, Tapp Oceano, Masayoshi KukiTales of Rebirth – WaltoTales of Xillia 2 – Nachtigal I. FanTriangle Strategy – Travis Valkyria Chronicles IV – PhoenixWhite Knight Chronicles – DregiazKingdom of Paradise – Lei Gai

1996Enemy Zero - George

1998Panzer Dragoon Saga – GashJoJo's Bizarre Adventure – Young Joseph Joestar

2000Midnight Club: Street Racing - Darren Thurrock

2002Panzer Dragoon Orta – Gash

2005Quantum Leap Layzelber – Layzer/Layzelber/DailayzerKingdom Hearts II – Xigbar

2006Captain Tsubasa – Makoto Sōda and Hermann Kaltz

2008Tales of Symphonia: Dawn of the New World – Tenebrae

2010Kingdom Hearts Birth by Sleep – BraigZangeki no Reginleiv – OdinYakuza 4 – Kazuo ShibataMetal Gear Solid: Peace Walker – Ramón Gálvez Mena

2011Kikokugai -Reichin Rinrinshan- – Ng Wing ShingTales of Xillia – Nachigal I. Fan

2012Kid Icarus: Uprising – Chariot Master, HadesKingdom Hearts 3D: Dream Drop Distance – Braig/XigbarBravely Default: Flying Fairy – Barras LehrE.X. Troopers – Kreis RavelProject X Zone – Meden Traore

2013Bravely Default: For the Sequel – Barras LehrJoJo's Bizarre Adventure: All-Star Battle – Hol HorseKamen Rider: Battride War - Callas

2015Yakuza 0 – Kazuo ShibataBravely Second – Barras LehrLego Jurassic World – Dr. Ian Malcolm (Japanese-dub release version)Metal Gear Solid V: The Phantom Pain – Evangelos Constantinou

2016Mighty No. 9 – CountershadeFate/Grand Order - Rider of Resistance/Christopher ColumbusSengoku BASARA Sanada Yukimura-den - Sanada Masayuki

2017The Legend of Heroes: Trails of Cold Steel III – Rutger Claussell

2019Kingdom Hearts III – Davy Jones, Xigbar/LuxuDeath Stranding – Heartman

2020Nioh 2 – Kashin Koji

2023Resident Evil 4 – Osmund Saddler

Dubbing roles

Voice-double
Jean-Claude Van DammeKickboxer – Kurt SloaneUniversal Soldier – Luc Deveraux / GR44Nowhere to Run – Sam GillenMaximum Risk – Alain Moreau / Mikhail SuverovDouble Team – Jack Paul QuinnUniversal Soldier: The Return – Luc DeverauxDerailed – Jacques KristoffUniversal Soldier: Regeneration – Luc DeverauxAssassination Games – Vincent BrazilDragon Eyes – TianoSix Bullets – Samson GaulU.F.O. – GeorgeWelcome to the Jungle – Storm RothchildJean-Claude Van Johnson – Johnson / Jean-Claude Van DammeKickboxer: Vengeance – Master DurandKill 'Em All – PhillipThe Last Mercenary – Richard Brumère / The Mist
Jeff GoldblumJurassic Park – Dr. Ian MalcolmIndependence Day – David LevinsonThe Lost World: Jurassic Park – Dr. Ian MalcolmHoly Man – Ricky HaymanCats & Dogs – Professor BrodyIgby Goes Down – D.H. BanesFriends – Leonard HayesMortdecai – KrampfIndependence Day: Resurgence – David LevinsonThor: Ragnarok – Grandmaster Jurassic World: Fallen Kingdom – Dr. Ian MalcolmThe World According to Jeff Goldblum – Jeff GoldblumWhat If...? – GrandmasterThe Boss Baby: Family Business – Dr. Erwin ArmstrongJurassic World Dominion – Dr. Ian Malcolm
Donnie YenOnce Upon a Time in China II – Nap-lan Yun-seutIp Man – Ip ManIp Man 2 – Ip ManSpecial ID – Dragon ChanKung Fu Jungle – Hahou MoThe Monkey King – Sun WukongIp Man 3 – Ip ManxXx: Return of Xander Cage – XiangChasing the Dragon – Crippled HoBig Brother – Henry Chen Xia / Chen HakIceman: The Time Traveller – Ho YingIp Man 4: The Finale - Ip ManEnter the Fat Dragon – Fallon ZhuRaging Fire – Cheung Sung-bong
Ray LiottaEscape from Absolum – John RobbinsCop Land – Gary FiggisTurbulence – Ryan WeaverHannibal – Paul KrendlerHeartbreakers – Dean CumannoIdentity – Samuel RhodesThe Last Shot – Jack DevineIn the Name of the King – GallianShades of Blue – Lieutenant Matt Wozniak
Tim RobbinsHoward the Duck (1990 Fuji TV edition) – Phil BlumburttBob Roberts – Bob RobertsI.Q. – Ed WaltersThe Shawshank Redemption – Andy DufresneNothing to Lose – Nick BeamAntitrust – Gary WinstonZathura: A Space Adventure (2008 NTV edition) – Mr. Budwing
Brent SpinerStar Trek: The Next Generation – DataStar Trek Generations – DataStar Trek: First Contact – DataStar Trek: Insurrection – DataStar Trek: Nemesis – Data
Kevin CostnerNo Way Out – Tom FarrellThe Untouchables – Eliot NessThe War – Stephen SimmonsWaterworld – The MarinerFor Love of the Game – Billy Chapel
Kurt RussellBreakdown – Jeff TaylorSky High – Steve Stronghold / The CommanderFurious 7 – Mr. NobodyThe Fate of the Furious – Mr. NobodyF9 – Mr. Nobody
Kevin KlineA Fish Called Wanda – Otto WestConsenting Adults – Richard ParkerFierce Creatures – Rod McCain / Vince McCainIn & Out – Howard BrackettWild Wild West (2002 NTV edition) – Artemus Gordon / Ulysses S. Grant
Bill PullmanSpaceballs – Lone StarrCasper (2004 DVD edition) – Dr. James HarveyWhile You Were Sleeping – Jack CallaghanIgnition – Conor Gallagher
Jeff DanielsArachnophobia – RossSpeed – HarryFly Away Home – Thomas Alden

Live-action10,000 BC (2011 TV Asahi edition) – Tic'Tic (Cliff Curtis)12 Rounds – Miles Jackson (Aidan Gillen)28 Days Later – Major Henry West (Christopher Eccleston)Admission – Mark (Michael Sheen)American Graffiti (2011 Blu-Ray edition) – Disc Jockey (Wolfman Jack)The Animal – Doug Sisk (John C. McGinley)Annie – Guy (Bobby Cannavale)Antichrist – He (Willem Dafoe)Baby's Day Out – Veeko Riley (Brian Haley)Bad Santa – Gin (Bernie Mac)Batman Begins (2008 Fuji TV edition) – Jim Gordon (Gary Oldman)The Beckoning Silence – Joe SimpsonBeyond Borders – Dr. Nick Callahan (Clive Owen)The Big White – Paul Barnell (Robin Williams)Billy Bathgate – Bo Weinberg (Bruce Willis)Black Beauty – John Manly (Iain Glen)The Black Dahlia – Detective Lee Blanchard (Aaron Eckhart)Black Hawk Down (2004 TV Tokyo edition) – SFC Jeff Sanderson (William Fichtner)Blackjack – Rory Gaines (Phillip MacKenzie)The Blacklist – Raymond "Red" Reddington (James Spader)Boyhood – Bill Welbrock (Marco Perella)Boys Don't Cry – John Lotter (Peter Sarsgaard)Bram Stoker's Dracula (15th Anniversary DVD edition) – Count Dracula (Gary Oldman)Bulletproof – Rock Keats / Jack Carter (Damon Wayans)By Way of Helena – Abraham Brant (Woody Harrelson)The Cabin in the Woods – Gary Sitterson (Richard Jenkins)Casualties of War – Corporal Thomas E. Clark (Don Harvey)Che – Fidel Castro (Demián Bichir)The Chronicles of Riddick – Lord Marshal (Colm Feore)Clash of the Titans – Draco (Mads Mikkelsen)Clash of the Titans (2012 TV Asahi edition) – Hades (Ralph Fiennes)Cobra – Detective Monte (Andrew Robinson)Confessions of a Dangerous Mind – Keeler (Rutger Hauer)Cool Runnings (1998 NTV edition) – Derice Bannock (Leon Robinson)The Core – Dr. John Keyes (Aaron Eckhart)Crisis – Dean Talbot (Greg Kinnear)Cube 2: Hypercube – Simon Grady (Geraint Wyn Davies)The Curious Case of Benjamin Button – Thomas Button (Jason Flemyng)Dangerous Beauty – Marco Venier (Rufus Sewell)Dark City – Dr. Daniel P. Schreber (Kiefer Sutherland)The Dark Knight (2012 TV Asahi edition) – Joker (Heath Ledger)Day of the Dead (2020 Blu-ray edition) – Dr. Matthew Logan (Richard Liberty)Deep Blue Sea – Carter Blake (Thomas Jane)Die Hard 2 – Colonel William Stuart (William Sadler)Die Hard with a Vengeance (1999 TV Asahi edition) – Zeus Carver (Samuel L. Jackson)Dolittle – Dr. Blair Müdfly (Michael Sheen)Domestic Disturbance – Rick Barnes (Vince Vaughn)Don't Say a Word – Patrick Koster (Sean Bean)The Doors – Ray Manzarek (Kyle MacLachlan)Double Jeopardy – Nick Parsons (Bruce Greenwood)Dough and Dynamite (2014 Star Channel edition) – Pierre (Charlie Chaplin)Dragon Lord – The Big Boss (Hwang In-shik)
Dune (1984) – Feyd-Rautha (Sting)
Dune (2021) – Gurney Halleck (Josh Brolin)Edge of Tomorrow – Master Sergeant Farell (Bill Paxton)EDtv – Ed Pekurny (Matthew McConaughey)Elizabeth – Robert Dudley (Joseph Fiennes)Enter the Dragon – Williams (Jim Kelly)Envy – Tim Dingman (Ben Stiller)ER – Ray "Shep" Shepard (Ron Eldard)Eragon – Galbatorix (John Malkovich)Evil Dead II (1991 TV Tokyo edition) – Ash Williams (Bruce Campbell)The Expendables – James Munroe (Eric Roberts)Fallen – Detective John Hobbes (Denzel Washington)Fargo (2002 TV Tokyo edition) – Carl Showalter (Steve Buscemi)A Few Good Men – Captain Jack Ross (Kevin Bacon)The Fifth Element – Korben Dallas (Bruce Willis)Flatliners (1996 NTV edition) – David Labraccio (Kevin Bacon)The Forgotten – Dr. Jack Munce (Gary Sinise)Frequency (2003 NTV edition) – Jack Shepard (Shawn Doyle)From the Earth to the Moon – Jim Lovell (Tim Daly)Full House – Danny Tanner (Bob Saget)Fuller House – Danny Tanner (Bob Saget)Get Out – Jim Hudson (Stephen Root)Get Smart (2011 TV Asahi edition) – Vice President (Geoff Pierson)Ghost – Carl Bruner (Tony Goldwyn)The Gift – Wayne Collins (Greg Kinnear)Gifted – Aubrey Highsmith (John Finn)Gilda – Ballin Mundson (George Macready)Gone in 60 Seconds – Raymond Calitri (Christopher Eccleston)Green Book – Frank "Tony Lip" Vallelonga (Viggo Mortensen)Green Zone – Clark Poundstone (Greg Kinnear)Guilty as Sin – David Greenhill (Don Johnson)Hannibal Rising – Vladis Grutas (Rhys Ifans)Hard Target (1997 Fuji TV edition) – Pik Van Cleef (Arnold Vosloo)Heat – Chris Shiherlis (Val Kilmer)Highlander – Connor MacLeod / Russell Nash (Christopher Lambert)His New Job (2014 Star Channel edition) – Film Extra (Charlie Chaplin)The Hitcher – John Ryder (Sean Bean)The Hollars – Don Hollar (Richard Jenkins)House of the Dragon – Ser Otto Hightower (Rhys Ifans)The Hunt for Red October (1993 TBS edition) – Jack Ryan (Alec Baldwin)Identity (2007 TV Tokyo edition) – Larry Washington (John Hawkes)Internal Affairs – Officer Van Stretch (William Baldwin)The Island – Dr. Merrick (Sean Bean)Jacob's Ladder (1993 NTV edition) – Michael Newman (Matt Craven)Jaws 2 (2022 BS Tokyo edition) – Len Peterson (Joseph Mascolo)Jennifer 8 – Special Agent St. Anne (John Malkovich)Judge Dredd – Herman Fergusson (Rob Schneider)Killing Eve – Konstantin Vasiliev (Kim Bodnia)Kingdom of Heaven – Guy de Lusignan (Marton Csokas)Knives Out – Richard Drysdale (Don Johnson)Ladder 49 – Leonard "Lenny" Richter (Robert Patrick)The Last Time – Ted Riker (Michael Keaton)A League of Their Own – Jimmy Dugan (Tom Hanks)Liberty Stands Still – Victor Wallace (Oliver Platt)Licence to Kill (2006 DVD edition) – James Bond (Timothy Dalton)Little House on the Prairie (2019 NHK BS4K edition) – Dr. Hiram Baker (Kevin Hagen)A Little Princess – Captain Richard Crewe (Liam Cunningham)The Living Daylights (2006 DVD edition) – James Bond (Timothy Dalton)
The Lord of the Rings film trilogy – Aragorn (Viggo Mortensen)Lucky Stars Go Places – Pagoda / Ginseng (Michael Miu)Machete – Von Jackson (Don Johnson)The Magnificent Seven (2013 Star Channel edition) – Chris Adams (Yul Brynner)Malcolm X – Shorty (Spike Lee)The Man in the Iron Mask – Athos (John Malkovich)The Mask of Zorro – Captain Harrison Love (Matt Letscher)
The Matrix trilogy (Fuji TV edition) – Agent Smith (Hugo Weaving)The Men Who Stare at Goats – Larry Hooper (Kevin Spacey)Missing in Action 2: The Beginning – Corporal Lawrence OpelkaMission: Impossible 2 – Sean Ambrose (Dougray Scott)Mortal Engines – Thaddeus Valentine (Hugo Weaving)A Most Wanted Man – Tommy Brue (Willem Dafoe)The Muse – Steven Phillips (Albert Brooks)Natural Born Killers – Wayne Gale (Robert Downey Jr.)The Negotiator (2001 TV Asahi edition) – Chris Sabian (Kevin Spacey)Nick of Time – Mr. Smith (Christopher Walken)Ocean's Eleven (2005 Fuji TV edition) – Terry Benedict (Andy García)Ocean's Twelve – Baron François Toulour (Vincent Cassel)Ocean's Twelve (2007 NTV edition) – Terry Benedict (Andy García)Ocean's Thirteen (2010 Fuji TV edition) – Terry Benedict (Andy García)Paparazzi – Rex Harper (Tom Sizemore)Pirates of the Caribbean: Dead Man's Chest – Davy Jones (Bill Nighy)Pirates of the Caribbean: At World's End – Davy Jones (Bill Nighy)Platoon (1998 DVD edition) – Elias Gordon (Willem Dafoe)Predator (1993 TV Asahi edition) – Jorge "Poncho" Ramírez (Richard Chaves)Predator 2 – Agent Keyes (Gary Busey)Predator 2 (1994 TV Asahi edition) – Agent Adam Garber (Adam Baldwin)Rapid Fire – Jake Lo (Brandon Lee)Reign of Fire – Denton Van Zan (Matthew McConaughey)Saw – Doctor Lawrence Gordon (Cary Elwes)Saw 3D – Doctor Lawrence Gordon (Cary Elwes)Secret Window – John Shooter (John Turturro)Sense and Sensibility – John Willoughby (Greg Wise)Seraphim Falls – Gideon (Pierce Brosnan)Shakespeare in Love – Lord Wessex (Colin Firth)A Simple Plan – Hank Mitchell (Bill Paxton)Slither – Grant Grant (Michael Rooker)Snow White and the Huntsman – Duke Hammond (Vincent Regan)Something to Talk About – Eddie Bichon (Dennis Quaid)Speed 2: Cruise Control (2000 Fuji TV edition) – John Geiger (Willem Dafoe)Stick It – Burt Vickerman (Jeff Bridges)Stormbreaker – Darrius Sayle (Mickey Rourke)Syriana – Jimmy Pope (Chris Cooper)The Tailor of Panama – Andy Osnard (Pierce Brosnan)Ted – Thomas Murphy (Matt Walsh)Ted 2 – Shep Wild (John Slattery)The Thirteenth Floor – Douglas Hall, John Ferguson, David (Craig Bierko)Ticker – Ray Nettles (Tom Sizemore)Tom & Jerry – Mr. DuBros (Rob Delaney)Touching the Void – Joe Simpson (Himself/Brendan Mackey)Tron: Legacy – Alan Bradley (Bruce Boxleitner)Troy – Odysseus (Sean Bean)Twin Peaks: Fire Walk with Me – James Hurley (James Marshall), Phillip Jeffries (David Bowie)Underworld – Lucian (Michael Sheen)Underworld: Rise of the Lycans – Lucian (Michael Sheen)Van Helsing – Count Dracula (Richard Roxburgh)Virtuosity – SID 6.7 (Russell Crowe)Virus (2002 NTV edition) – J. W. Woods Jr. (Marshall Bell)War Horse – Lyons (David Thewlis)Wayne's World 2 – Robert G. Cahn (Christopher Walken)The Wedding Singer – Sammy (Allen Covert)Welcome to Sarajevo – Jimmy Flynn (Woody Harrelson)West Side Story (1990 TBS edition) – Tony (Richard Beymer)Wheels on Meals – Mondale (José Sancho)Working Girl – Mick Dugan (Alec Baldwin)The World Is Not Enough (2003 TV Asahi edition) – Davidov (Ulrich Thomsen)World War Z – Captain Speke (James Badge Dale)The X-Files – Investigator John Doggett (Robert Patrick)The Young Master – Master Kam (Hwang In-shik)

AnimationArthur Christmas – Steven "Steve" ClausBuzz Lightyear of Star Command – Warp DarkmatterCaptain Planet and the Planeteers – Captain Planet, NarratorCars 2 – Finn McMissileChicken Little – Don BowowserChuggington – HanzoEarly Man – Lord NoothHop – CarlosThe Iron Giant – Kent MansleyPlaymobil: The Movie – BloodbonesScoob! – Dick DastardlyUp'' – Alpha the Doberman

Other Japanese
 Pirates of the Caribbean – Davy Jones

Awards

References

External links
Official agency profile 
Hōchū Ōtsuka  at Ryu's Seiyuu Infos

1954 births
Living people
Male voice actors from Okayama Prefecture
Japanese male video game actors
Japanese male voice actors
20th-century Japanese male actors
21st-century Japanese male actors